This is a list of lists of neighborhoods in cities around the world. An asterisk indicates a separate article.

Argentina
Buenos Aires (Barrios) *

Australia 

Sydney *
Melbourne *
Brisbane *
Perth *
Adelaide *
Gold Coast *
Newcastle *
Canberra *
Wollongong *
Hobart *
Townsville *
Darwin *

Brazil 
São Paulo *

Canada 

Toronto *
East York *
Etobicoke *
North York *
Scarborough *
York *
Montreal *
Ottawa *
Vancouver *

China, People's Republic of

Mainland China
Beijing

Hong Kong
Hong Kong *
Hong Kong - Sites and areas *

India

Bangalore *
Bhubaneswar *
Chennai *
Delhi *
Hyderabad *
Kochi *
Kolkata *
Mumbai *
Visakhapatnam *

Japan 
Kyoto
Nara
Osaka
Tokyo

New Zealand
Auckland *
Dunedin *

Portugal 
Lisbon
Porto

Russia 
Moscow (Administrative divisions)
Saint Petersburg (Administrative divisions)

Serbia 
Belgrade (neighbourhoods and suburbs)
Novi Sad (neighborhoods)

Singapore 
Singapore (places) *
Singapore (subdivisions) *

South Africa 
 Cape Town *
Durban *
 Johannesburg *
Pretoria *

Spain 
 Alicante
 Barcelona
 Bilbao
 Córdoba
 Granada
 Madrid
 Málaga
 Murcia
 Palma de Mallorca
 Seville
 Valencia
 Valladolid
 Vigo
 Zaragoza

United Kingdom 
 London *
 Barking and Dagenham *
 Barnet *
 Bexley *
 Brent *
 Bromley *
 Camden *
 Croydon *
 Ealing *
 Enfield *
 Greenwich *
 Hackney *
 Hammersmith and Fulham *
 Haringey *
 Harrow *
 Havering *
 Hillingdon *
 Hounslow *
 Islington *
 Kensington and Chelsea *
 Kingston upon Thames *
 Lambeth *
 Lewisham *
 Merton *
 Newham *
 Redbridge *
 Richmond upon Thames
 Southwark
 Sutton *
 Tower Hamlets *
 Waltham Forest *
 Wandsworth *
 Westminster *
Bristol *
Manchester *
Scotland*

United States 
 Austin *
 Baltimore *
 Berkeley *
 Birmingham *
 Boston *
 Buffalo
 Burbank
 Calabasas
 Glendale*
 Charlotte *
 Chicago
 Community areas of Chicago *
 Neighborhoods of Chicago *
 Cincinnati *
 Cleveland
 Columbus, Georgia *
 Columbus, Ohio *
 Dallas *
 Delaware *
 Detroit *
 Duluth *
 Elizabeth
 Fort Worth *
 Greensboro *
 Harrisburg *
 Honolulu
 Houston *
 Indianapolis *
 Jersey City *
 Long Beach
 Los Angeles *
 Louisville * 
 Memphis *
 Miami *
 Milwaukee *
 Minneapolis *
 Moline
 Newark *
 New Orleans *
 New York *
 Bronx *
 Brooklyn *
 Manhattan *
 Pasadena *
 Queens *
 Staten Island *
 Oakland
 Omaha *
 Perth Amboy
 Philadelphia *
 Pittsburgh *
 Portland *
 Raleigh *
 Richmond * 
 Saint Paul *
 San Antonio *
 San Fernando *
 San Diego *
 San Francisco *
 Seattle *
 St. Louis *
 Syracuse *
 Tampa *
 Worcester *
 Phoenix*
 Washington D.C *
 Wilmington DE *

Ukraine 

 Kyiv *

See also
 List of administrative divisions by country
 Gay village
 List of named ethnic enclaves in North American cities

Lists of cities
Lists by city